Pharasgaon or Parasgaon is a town in Kondagaon district, Chhattisgarh, India.

Geography

Location
National Highway 30 passes through Pharasgaon. Nearest airport is Raipur Airport and nearest railway station is at Jagdalpur.

Kandagaon is 30 km south and Keskal 25 km north of Pharasgaon.

External links
 Wikimapia

References

Cities and towns in Kondagaon district